The Sakhalin Oblast Duma is the regional parliament of Sakhalin Oblast, a federal subject of Russia. Together with the executive and judicial branches, the oblast's legislative assembly is vested with power to control the oblast's own affairs with moderate levels of autonomy from Moscow. A total of 28 deputies are elected for five-year terms.

History
Prior to the dissolution of the Soviet Union, the Supreme Soviet of RSFSR was the legislative body of the Soviet Union that was elected by members of the Congress of People's Deputies of Russia. The Supreme Soviet of Russia itself contained the Council of the Republic and the Council of Nationalities, which represented the population size of the federal subjects and the federal subjects itself respectively. During the Russian constitutional crisis of 1993, the activities of the regional council of people's deputies was terminated and power was decentralized to the individual federal subjects in accordance with the presidential decree of October 9, 1993 (No. 1617) "On the Reform of Representative Authorities and Local Self-Government in the Russian Federation" and the decision of the Sakhalin Oblast Governor of October 16, 1993 (No. 251) "On the reform of the Sakhalin Regional People's Deputies".

In its aftermath, in accordance with another presidential decree of October 22, 1993 (No. 1723) “On the Basic Principles of the Organization of State Power in the Subjects of the Russian Federation”, the Provisional Regulation on the Regional Duma, which would be the legislative body of Sakhalin Oblast, was approved by the Sakhalin Oblast Governor via decision No. 65 on February 2, 1994. The regulation establishes that the oblast Duma will consist of 16 deputies elected by the population of the region and would have a term of two years.

Structure
As with most of the regional parliaments of Russia, the Oblast Duma is unicameral. It currently comprises 28 deputies, with 14 of them running in single-mandate constituencies and the other 14 in a single at-large electoral district. 14 members are elected in single-member districts by first-past-the-post voting while another 14 are selected by party-list proportional representation in a single island-wide electoral district. The Oblast Duma, as with all regional legislatures in Russia, elects the Oblast's representation in the Federation Council , the upper house of the bicameral Federal Assembly, the national parliament

A two-thirds majority vote is needed for a charter or its amendments to be adopted by the Duma. While a simple majority vote is needed for resolutions or laws to be passed in the Duma.

The executive branch of Sakhalin works closely with the oblast's Duma. The executive branch is also known as the government of Sakhalin and is headed by the governor, who is the highest ranking person in the oblast. The Governor is not to be confused with the Chairman of the Duma, who is head of the Duma only.

Elections

2017

2022

Chairmen

Previous legislative assemblies

References

Government of Russia
Legislatures of the federal subjects of Russia
Politics of Sakhalin Oblast